Remsley Boelijn (born 23 February 1995) is a Curaçaoan footballer who plays for SUBT of the Curaçao Sekshon Pagá, and the Sint Maarten national team.

Club career
From 2006 to 2008 Boelijn played for RKSV Centro Dominguito youth team before being transferred to Quick'60 from 2008 to 2010. From 2011 to 2016, Boelijn played for ASC St. Louis Stars in the Saint-Martin Championships. In 2016, he transferred to RKSV Scherpenheuvel of the Curaçao Sekshon Pagá, the top football league in Curaçao. Now (2017- he is transferred to SUBT of the Curaçao Sekshon Pagá

International career
Boelijn made his international debut for Sint Maarten on 22 March 2016 in a 2017 Caribbean Cup qualification match against Grenada. He scored his first international goal in the team's next match, a 1–2 defeat to the United States Virgin Islands. These two matches were Sint Maarten's first competitive matches in 19 years.

International goals
Scores and results list Sint Maartens's goal tally first.

International career statistics

References

External links
 
 Caribbean Football Database profile

Living people
1995 births
Association football defenders
Association football midfielders
Sint Maarten international footballers
Sint Maarten footballers
Curaçao footballers
People from Willemstad
Sekshon Pagá players
RKSV Centro Dominguito players
RKSV Scherpenheuvel players
Sport Unie Brion Trappers players